Nocardia ignorata is a species of bacteria and a member of the genus Nocardia. Its type strain is IMMIB R-1434T (= DSM 44496T = NRRL B-24141T).

References

Further reading

External links
 
 LPSN
 Type strain of Nocardia ignorata at BacDive -  the Bacterial Diversity Metadatabase

Mycobacteriales
Gram-positive bacteria
Bacteria described in 2001